Fifteen teams participated in the 1979 ICC Trophy, the inaugural edition of the tournament. Fourteen of those were members of the International Cricket Council (ICC), while the other team was Wales, participating by invitation.

Argentina
Only players who appeared in at least one match at the tournament are listed. The leading run-scorer is marked with a dagger (†) and the leading wicket-taker with a double dagger (‡).

 Douglas Annand
 Derek Culley
 Tony Ferguson †
 Malcolm Gibson
 Robert Kirton
 Martin Martinez
 Alan Morris ‡

 Christopher Nino
 Michael Ryan
 Peter Stocks
 Charles Tudor
 Rafael Villamil
 Brian Ward

Source: ESPNcricinfo

Bangladesh
Only players who appeared in at least one match at the tournament are listed. The leading run-scorer is marked with a dagger (†) and the leading wicket-taker with a double dagger (‡).

 Ashraful Haque †‡
 Belayet Hossain
 Daulat Zaman
 Dipu Roy Chowdhury
 Jahangir Shah
 Mujibul Haque
 Mustafizur Rahman

 Najmun Noor
 Omar Khaled
 Raqibul Hasan
 Shafiq-ul-Haq
 Yousuf Rahman
 Ziaul Islam

Source: ESPNcricinfo

Bermuda
Only players who appeared in at least one match at the tournament are listed. The leading run-scorer is marked with a dagger (†) and the leading wicket-taker with a double dagger (‡).

 Joseph Bailey
 Colin Blades
 Gladstone Brown
 Barry de Couto
 Noel Gibbons
 Elvin James

 Clarence Parfitt
 Winston Reid †
 Lionel Thomas
 Winston Trott ‡
 John Tucker
 Clevie Wade

Source: ESPNcricinfo

Canada
Only players who appeared in at least one match at the tournament are listed. The leading run-scorer is marked with a dagger (†) and the leading wicket-taker with a double dagger (‡).

 Charles Baksh
 Garnet Brisbane
 Christopher Chappell
 Franklyn Dennis
 Cornelius Henry
 Tariq Javed
 Cecil Marshall

 Bryan Mauricette
 Jitendra Patel
 Glenroy Sealy
 Martin Stead
 John Valentine
 John Vaughan †‡

Source: ESPNcricinfo

Denmark
Only players who appeared in at least one match at the tournament are listed. The leading run-scorer is marked with a dagger (†) and the leading wicket-taker with a double dagger (‡).

 Jørn Beier
 Ole Beier
 Klaus Buus
 Keld Kristensen
 Carsten Morild ‡
 Claus Morild

 Henrik Mortensen †
 Ole Mortensen ‡
 Torben Nielsen
 Morten Petersson
 Bent Rossen
 Steen Thomsen

Source: ESPNcricinfo

East Africa
Only players who appeared in at least one match at the tournament are listed. The leading run-scorer is marked with a dagger (†) and the leading wicket-taker with a double dagger (‡).

 Zulfiqar Ali ‡
 Keith Arnold
 Bharat Desai
 Hitesh Mehta
 P. D. Mehta
 Ramesh Patel
 Yusuf Patel

 Majid Pandor
 Abdul Rehman
 Jawahir Shah †
 Charanjive Sharma
 Narendra Thakker
 Jaswinder Warah

Source: ESPNcricinfo

Fiji
Only players who appeared in at least one match at the tournament are listed. The leading run-scorer is marked with a dagger (†) and the leading wicket-taker with a double dagger (‡).

 Alan Apted
 Cecil Browne †
 Peni Dakainivanua ‡
 Metusela Isimeli ‡
 Roderick Jepsen
 Joeli Nambuka
 Seci Sekinini

 Jaswant Singh
 Uraia Sorovakatini
 Isoa Suka
 Inoke Tambualevu
 Frederick Valentine
 Ilikena Vuli
 Apenisa Wanggatambu

Source: ESPNcricinfo

Israel
Only players who appeared in at least one match at the tournament are listed. The leading run-scorer is marked with a dagger (†) and the leading wicket-taker with a double dagger (‡).

 Larry Barnett
 Aaron Benjamin
 Howard Horowitz
 Michael Jacob
 Barry Kanpol
 Jerrold Kessel
 Michael Mohnblatt

 Zion Moses
 David Moss †
 Stanley Perlman
 Nissam Reuben
 Reuben Reuben ‡
 Isaac Solomon
 Leslie Susser

Source: ESPNcricinfo

Malaysia
Only players who appeared in at least one match at the tournament are listed. The leading run-scorer is marked with a dagger (†) and the leading wicket-taker with a double dagger (‡).

 Alwi Zaman
 Banerji Nair
 Bhupinder Singh Gill
 C. Navaratnam
 Chan Yow Choy
 Harris Abu Bakar

 Hatta Pattabongi
 K. Kamalanathan
 K. Sekar ‡
 Mahinder Singh †
 Rasiah Ratnalingham
 Tah Choo Beng

Source: ESPNcricinfo

Netherlands
Only players who appeared in at least one match at the tournament are listed. The leading run-scorer is marked with a dagger (†) and the leading wicket-taker with a double dagger (‡).

 Edouard Abendanon
 Ton Bakker †
 Peter Entrop
 Mar Flohil
 Steven Lubbers
 Rene Schoonheim

 Jan Spits
 Menso van Meurs
 Chris van Schouwenburg
 Rob van Weelde ‡
 Peter van Wel

Source: ESPNcricinfo

Papua New Guinea
Only players who appeared in at least one match at the tournament are listed. The leading run-scorer is marked with a dagger (†) and the leading wicket-taker with a double dagger (‡).

 Nigel Agonia
 Kila Alewa ‡
 Vele Amini
 Lou Ao
 Tau Ao
 La'a Aukopi
 Charles Harrison

 Api Leka †
 Sam Malum
 Vavine Pala
 Ilinome Tarua
 Pala Ura
 Taunao Vai

Source: ESPNcricinfo

Singapore
Only players who appeared in at least one match at the tournament are listed. The leading run-scorer is marked with a dagger (†) and the leading wicket-taker with a double dagger (‡).

 Mukhtar Ahmed
 Christopher da Silva
 Goh Swee Heng
 Stephen Houghton †
 Pranlal Ishwarlal
 Mohanvelu Jeevanathan
 Frederick Martens

 Rex Martens
 Mahesh Mehta
 Stacey Muruthi
 Sitharam Sethivail
 Harnam Singh
 Pritam Singh
 Lawrence Young Ken Sen ‡

Source: ESPNcricinfo

Sri Lanka
Only players who appeared in at least one match at the tournament are listed. The leading run-scorer is marked with a dagger (†) and the leading wicket-taker with a double dagger (‡).

 Somachandra de Silva ‡
 Stanley de Silva
 Roy Dias
 Ranjan Gunatilleke
 Rohan Jayasekera
 Sunil Jayasinghe
 Sridharan Jeganathan

 Ranjan Madugalle
 Duleep Mendis †
 Tony Opatha
 Sudath Pasqual
 Anura Tennekoon
 Bandula Warnapura ‡
 Sunil Wettimuny

Source: ESPNcricinfo

United States
Only players who appeared in at least one match at the tournament are listed. The leading run-scorer is marked with a dagger (†) and the leading wicket-taker with a double dagger (‡).

 Masood Akhtar
 Ivan Atherley
 Walter Bovell
 Michael Gordon
 Stephen Jones ‡
 Hasib Khan
 Ophnell Larrier

 Anil Lashkari †
 Neil Lashkari
 Sri Nagesh
 Kamran Rasheed ‡
 John Reid
 Wayne Stuger

Source: ESPNcricinfo

Wales
Only players who appeared in at least one match at the tournament are listed. The leading run-scorer is marked with a dagger (†) and the leading wicket-taker with a double dagger (‡).

 John Bell
 Stuart Carey
 William Edwards
 Geoff Ellis
 Alan Geoghegan ‡
 Wayne Harries

 Jeffris Hopkins †
 David Jones
 David Knight
 Nigel Owen
 Billy Slade
 Geoff Williams

Source: ESPNcricinfo

Sources
 CricketArchive: Averages by teams, ICC Trophy 1979
 ESPNcricinfo: ICC Trophy, 1979 / Statistics

Cricket squads
ICC World Cup Qualifier